Besthiyage Don Bertie Sangathissa Gunathilake (බර්ටි ගුණතිලක; 2 August 1924 – 6 March 2022), popularly as Berty Gunathilake, was an actor and comedian in Sri Lankan cinema and television. He was most notable for the role "Baba" in television comedy sitcom Vinoda Samaya.

Personal life
Gunathilake was born on 2 August 1924 in Ampitiya, Kandy. He received his primary education at Ampitiya Primary School and then secondary education from Sangharaja Pirivena in Kandy. After that he joined the Ayurvedic Medical College. After school times, he joined as an Assistant Teacher at Galpola College, Kuliyapitiya. Then he started a bookstore until he was bored by the job and then worked as a proofreader in the Sinhala Bauddaya newspaper. He was in the distribution department at the inception of the 1953 People's Newspaper. In 1953, he joined Lake House publishers with the help of Chandraratne Manawasinghe and Meemana Premathilake. He worked there as a junior pastor for twelve years. During that time, he joined the struggles conducted by Lake House trade union. As a result, he lost the job.

He was married to Soma Gunathilake, a teacher. He met Soma during a school function when Gunathilake was invited as a guest at a function held at Amatiyagoda College, Godakawela. His wife died in 1993.

The couple had two sons – Bharatha and Harsha; and two daughters – Jeevani and Kumuduni. Bharatha is a television technician. Harsha is a businessman. Kumuduni works for the Rupavahini Corporation.

Gunathilake died at the Kahawatta Base Hospital in Kahawatta on 6 March 2022, at the age of 97.

Career
Gunathilake joined the Radio Ceylon in 1947 from Lama Pitiya program. Then he joined the 1948 radio play Vinoda Samaya along with Joseph Seneviratne, Vincent Weerasekera, Harriet Suraweera, Pitipana Silva and Sisira Kumara Manickaarachchi. In 1952, Bertie was anointed as Sri Lanka's first amateur comedian in the Bushels Coffee program hosted by Thevis Guruge.

In 1954, Gunathilake along with his close friends Annesley Dias and Samuel Rodrigu presented the comic program Vihilu Thahalu for Radio Ceylon under the guidance of H.D. Wijedasa. It became extremely popular and they were colloquially known as Raja Thun Kattuwa. In later years, many more characters were included in the program such as Gemunu Wijesuriya, Joseph Seneviratne, Alfred Perera and Mercy Edirisinghe.

In 1983, television shows started in Sri Lanka. The trio - Berty, Annesley and Samuel included in television's founding program Nandana Vindana. Since 1960 to 1990, they appeared in almost every comedy show in television and radio. Once, Gunathilake pretended a role "Two Tone" as a schoolboy, wearing a pair of shorts, a teat in his mouth, a bottle of water, a pencil and a book in the popular comedy sitcom Vinoda Samaya. The character was highly popularized. He has written most of the episodes of Vinoda Samaya, such as "Apuru Maluwa", "Santhoshaya", "Athe Amaruwa", "Apuru Adaraya", "Maduru Mediri Resweema", and Uu mata Gehuwa, Mata uu Gehuwa.

It was a story told by a man in the Kiribathgoda bus in Angulana who had been talking about a rivalry that had taken place in early day. It is all about that he has been hit by others, and he could not fight back. By using this incidence, Gunathilake made the popular program with the title - Uu mata gehuwa, mata uu gehuwa (meaning he hit me, I was hit by him). This catch phrase was highly popularized in Sri Lanka.

His maiden cinema appearance came through 1951 film Banda Nagarayata Paminima directed by Raja Wahab Kashmeer. It was the first film made in a local studio. Then he acted in many supportive comedy roles in popular commercial films such as Pem Mal Mala, Palama Yata, Deviyani Sathya Surakinna, Mana Mohini and Somy Boys.

In 2013, his biography Sadadaraneeya Berty written by Kingsley Wijesundara was launched along with Gunathilake's 89th birthday party at his residence at Godakawela, Kosnathota.

On 13 November 2013, The Ministry of Cultural Affairs conferred the "Desha Nethru" Award  at the National Literary Arts Festival. On 12 January 2014, he has honored with Lifetime Achievement Award for Service to the Television Industry in Rupavahini State Awards. In 2021, he was honored with lifetime achievement award during the ceremony held for 21 artists who made an invaluable contribution to Sinhala cinema in the early decades of Sinhala Cinema.

Filmography

References

External links
 ජනමාධ්‍ය ඇමති රංගන ශිල්පි බර්ටි ගුණතිලකගේ සැපදුක් විමසයි
 මිය ගිය පසුව නොව ජීවත්ව සිටියදී අගය කළ යුතු චරිත – බර්ටි ගුණතිලක
 ප්‍රවීණ කලාකරු බර්ටි ගැන හුවමාරුවන පුවත ව්‍යාජයි
 රවීණ කලාකරු බර්ටි ගුණතිලක මහතාගේ ඉල්ලීමට ජනපතිගේ අවධානය
 ඉස්සර කරපු දේවල් කරන්ඩ බැරිකම ගැන තමා දුක
 විහිලු තහළු, උසුළු විසුළු, කවටකම් ආදිය දියුණු සමාජයක ලක්ෂණද?
 බර්ටිට ඇමති විමල්ගෙන් නිවසක්
 ඌ මට ගැහුවා මට ඌ ගැහුවා
 

1924 births
2022 deaths
People from Kandy District
Sinhalese male actors
Sri Lankan comedians
Sri Lankan male film actors
People from British Ceylon